Arthrostylidium cubense  is a species of Arthrostylidium bamboo native to Central America, the West Indies, northern South America, and southern Mexico.

References

cubense
Plants described in 1839